The following is a list of places named after Saint Thérèse of Lisieux.

Argentina
Santa Teresita, municipality in Buenos Aires Province

Australia
The tiny remote Aboriginal community Santa Teresa in the Central Desert was named after Saint Therese of Lisieux. There is a Catholic Church in the town also of her namesake.

Belize
Santa Teresita, village in Cayo District

Bermuda
 The Roman Catholic cathedral of the Diocese of Hamilton in Bermuda, St. Theresa's

Brazil
Santa Teresinha, municipality in Bahia
Santa Terezinha, municipality in Mato Grosso
Santa Terezinha, municipality in Pernambuco
Santa Terezinha, municipality in Santa Catarina
Santa Terezinha do Progresso, municipality in Santa Catarina
Santa Terezinha do Tocantins, municipality in Tocantins
Santa Terezinha de Goiás, municipality in Goiás
Santa Terezinha de Itaipu, municipality in Paraná
Santa Teresinha, municipality in Paraíba
Paróquia Santa Teresinha in São Paulo
St. Therese Cathedral in Bacabal, Maranhão

Canada

 The municipality of Sainte-Thérèse-de-la-Gatineau, Quebec, is named in her honour. There is a neighborhood in Québec City, Québec named after her.  There is a community in northeastern Manitoba, named St. Theresa Point, Manitoba. Nearby, there is also a North American Native band named St. Theresa Point First Nation. They are situated on the southwest shore of Island Lake.
 There is a Thérèse-Martin School in Joliette, Quebec. In Ontario, there is a St. Theresa of Lisieux Catholic High School in Richmond Hill, a St. Theresa's High School in Midland and a St. Theresa's School in Sault Ste. Marie.  There is a Little Flower Academy in Vancouver, British Columbia.
 The Society of the Little Flower and Shrine to St Thérèse is in Niagara Falls, Ont. There is St. Therese of Lisieux Catholic School, Hamilton, Ont.
 A school in Toronto, Ontario, St. Theresa Shrine
 Theresetta Catholic School in Castor, Alberta
 St. Theresa's Catholic Church in Halifax, Nova Scotia
 A catholic elementary school in Saskatoon, Saskatchewan

Egypt
 Basilica of St Therese of the Child Jesus, Cairo
 La Rose de Lisieux School, Cairo

Hong Kong
 St. Teresa's Church
 St. Teresa Secondary School

India
St Therese of child jesus's first church in the world is in kandanvillai, kanyakumari, Tamil Nadu. where the church bell hung is gifted by st therese's elder sister.
 Little Flower Latin Catholic Church, Pottakuzhy, Ernakulam, Ernakulam Dt, India. Asia's first church built on honour of St. Therese of Lisieux
 Mar Augustine Memorial Lisie Hospital, Ernakulam
 Little Flower Hospital, Angamaly,Ernakulum 
Little Flower convent Higher secondary school,Koratty, Thrissur 
 Little Flower church, Kumbidy, Thrissur 
 St. Theresa's Convent Sr. Sec. School, Karnal (HR), India
 St. Theresa of Lisieux Catholic Church, Vellayambalam, Trivandrum, India
 St. Therese of Infant Jesus Catholic Church, Kandanvilai, Kanyakumari Dt, India. It is blessed on April 7, 1924.
 Little Flower Girls High School Vadakara, Koothattukulam, Kerala, India
 Little Flower Church, Madappally, Changanasserry, Kottayam Dt, Kerala, India
 Lisieux Matriculation Higher Secondary School, Coimbatore, Tamil Nadu, India
 St. Theresa Church, Crawford, Trichy, Tamil Nadu, India. Built during 1934.
 Little Flower Girls Hr Sec School, Crawford. Managed by Sisters of St Annes, Trichy; Trichy, Tamil Nadu, India.
 St. Theresa's Boys High School, Bandra, Mumbai, India. http://theresianboyz.org
 Little Flower High School, Hyderabad, Telangana, India

Ireland
 St. Thérèse of Lisieux Oratory and St. Thérèse of Lisieux Primary School, in north Belfast.

The Netherlands
 Theresialyceum, secondary school in Tilburg, the Netherlands, was founded on October 3, 1926, by the Sisters of Charity of Our Lady Mother of Mercy.

Philippines
 Shrine of St. Therese, Doctor of the Church, in Villamor Air Base (Nichols), Pasay, Philippines. Completed in 1983 as a chapel and reconstructed in 2005 and completed in 2007 during which it was declared as a diocesan shrine of the Military Ordinariate of the Philippines.
 The Saint Therese of the Child Jesus Parish Church inside the University of the Philippines Los Baños campus under the Roman Catholic Diocese of San Pablo.
 The municipality of Santa Teresita, Batangas was named in her honor.
 St. Theresita's Academy, a Catholic secondary school in Silay City, Negros Occidental, is named after the saint.
 St. Therese of the Child Jesus Parish - Dagupan City

Turkey
 Azize Tereza Church in Ulus, Ankara

United Kingdom
 Parish of St. Thérèse of Lisieux, Roman Catholic Diocese of Middlesbrough, Ingleby Barwick, Stockton-on-Tees, England.
 St. Thérèse of Lisieux R.C. Primary School, Ingleby Barwick, Stockton-on-Tees, England.
 St. Thérèse R.C. Primary School, Heaton, England
 Parish of the Sacred Heart and St. Teresa in Coleshill, Birmingham.
 St Theresa of Lisieux R.C. Church, Northiam, East Sussex
 St Theresa of the Child Jesus R.C. Church, Princes Risborough, Buckinghamshire
 St Theresa of Lisieux R.C. Church, Southwick, West Sussex

United States
 In 1919, the Shrine of St. Thérèse was founded in Fresno, California.
Beginning in the 1920s, the National Shrine of St. Therese was housed at St. Clara's Carmelite Church in the south side of Chicago (destroyed by fire in 1975, relocated at Darien, Illinois).
 On August 23, 1923, the Shrine of the Little Flower and St. Theresa of the Child Jesus Parish in Nasonville, Rhode Island, was founded as the first shrine and parish named in honor of St. Therese in the world just four months after she was beatified.
 On December 25, 1924, the Irish Province of the Discalced Carmelite Friars officially founded St. Therese Church in Alhambra, California, and dedicated it to Blessed Therese of the Child Jesus. 
 On March 13, 1925, St. Therese of the Infant Jesus in Indianapolis was established. The parish has both a church and a school, commonly referred to as Little Flower.
 In May 1925, St. Therese of the Child Jesus in Philadelphia was established and named in honor of Saint Therese.
 In June 1925, St. Thérèse of Lisieux Catholic Church in Cresskill, New Jersey, was established.
 In 1925, Little Flower Parish, Church and School was founded in Richmond Heights, Missouri.  This is the same year that St. Therese of Lisieux was canonized. 
 In 1926, the National Shrine of the Little Flower in Royal Oak, Michigan, was built in honor of Thérèse of Lisieux.
 In 1926, Church of the Little Flower was established in Coral Gables, Florida.
In 1926, The Church of Saint Teresa of the Infant Jesus  was established in the Castleton Corners area of Staten Island, New York.
In 1926, St Therese of Lisieux Roman Catholic Church was established in Brooklyn, New York.
 In 1926, St. Therese Little Flower Parish in Cincinnati, Ohio, began in a blacksmith shop converted into a chapel at the corner of North Bend Road and Colerain Avenue. Soon after, plans were drawn for the original church and school. Archbishop John T. McNicholas granted permission to start construction in July 1928. The church and school were completed in March 1929.
 In 1927 named after St. Therese of Lisieux, St. Therese Parish of Southgate, Kentucky, is a member of the Roman Catholic Diocese of Covington, Kentucky and is designated the Diocesan Shrine of The Little Flower.
 In 1927, St. Thérèse de Lisieux Church and Parish was founded by Italian immigrants. It is the largest Catholic church in Uniontown, Pennsylvania.
In 1929, Little Flower Mission (Later Little Flower Parish) in Middlebranch, Ohio.  A permanent Church was later built and dedicated in 1977, and a preschool was started in 1974.
 In 1930, St. Therese the Little Flower Catholic Church was established.  It was the 12th parish of Memphis.
In 1930, Little Flower Elementary School was opened in Memphis, Tennessee, by the Sisters of Charity of Nazareth. The school currently operates as one of the diocesan Jubilee Schools.
 In 1931, the Basilica of the National Shrine of the Little Flower, located in San Antonio, Texas, was established.
In 1931, the Parish of Saint Theresa of the Child Jesus was established in Honolulu, Hawaii. It was later elevated to a co-cathedral.
 In 1934, Father Jimmy Byrnes opened Little Flower Catholic School in Mobile, Alabama.
 In 1939, Cardinal Dougherty built a high school in Philadelphia, Pennsylvania, in honor of St. Thérèse: Little Flower Catholic High School for Girls.
In 1948 Saint Therese of the Little Flower Catholic Church was founded in Reno, Nevada.
 In 1948, a Little Flower parish was established in Bethesda, Maryland, with the Reverend Edward J. O'Brien as its first pastor. 
 In 1952, St. Theresa of the Child Jesus was built in Leeds, Alabama, with the first Mass offered on July 27 by Fr. James Gallagher; the church was later dedicated by Bishop Toolen on February 15, 1953.
In 1962 the Little Flower School was established in Reno, Nevada.
 In 1971, the parish of Saint Theresa of the Child Jesus was established in Carlyss, Louisiana.
 In 1987, the Nation Shrine Museum of St. Therese building was dedicated at Darien, Illinois.
 In San Diego, California, St. Thérèse of the Child Jesus is an established church and elementary school.
 In Beulaville, North Carolina, is a small Spanish speaking mission church named Santa Teresa del Niño Jesús Catholic Mission

 There is a Shrine of St. Therese  of Lisieux in the New Columbus section of Nesquehoning, Pennsylvania.  It was established in 2010 and officially made a diocesan shrine by the Allentown, PA diocese in 2012.  Every year on the first Sunday of October a Shower of Roses celebration is held here in honor of St. Therese, the Little Flower.
 Saint Therese of the Little Flower Catholic Church in Reno, Nevada USA also has an elementary school on the property called Little Flower School.

Gallery

See also
 Church of St. Thérèse of Lisieux (disambiguation)
 Saint Therese (disambiguation)

Sources

Saint Therese of Lisieux
Therese of Lisieux